The Flash and Circle is a fascist symbol used by several organisations. It was first used by the British Union of Fascists (BUF), and was adopted in 1935.

Origins within the BUF (1935-1940) 

The BUF was founded in 1932 and adopted the fasces as its emblem, whose bundle of sticks represents strength through unity, and whose axe represents the supreme authority of the state to which citizens owe allegiance. Although the fasces was utilized almost exclusively by Benito Mussolini's Blackshirts, the BUF claimed that they had a right to use the symbol on the basis that the fasces was used extensively in Britain during Roman times, and that the British Empire continued to carry on the tradition of civilisation from them. The symbol would officially be changed in March 1934 from the plain gold fasces to a Union Flag within a shield and a fasces placed on top. The reasons for this change was that the BUF wanted to emphasise its commitment to king and country through the addition of the national emblem, the other reason was to help the movement distinguish itself in foreign nations.

Starting in the 1930s, the fasces began to be phased out in favour of the BUF's final symbol, the Flash and Circle. In the summer of 1935, Eric H. Piercy, the commander of the Fascist Defence Force designed the emblem and presented it to Oswald Mosley, the BUF's leader. The official colors were: a white lightning bolt ("flash") and circle, a blue roundel, and a red background. The symbolism of this design was meant to convey a flash of action within a circle of unity. While there was a lack of consistency in the appearance of the Flash and Circle, such as the short-lived inverted version used in 1935, it would go on to become the main symbol of the party and was used extensively throughout 1935-1940. The BUF's left-wing opponents nicknamed the symbol the "flash in the pan". The usage of any symbols by the BUF would slowly decline after the party was banned and its leadership (including Mosley) was interned on 23 May 1940 under Defence Regulation 18B.

Post-war usage (1948 onwards)
After being released from internment, Mosley would continue his political activities, creating the Union Movement (UM) in February 1948. The UM would go on to adopt the Flash and Circle as its symbol. Throughout the 50s and 60s multiple branch flags were adopted using a black background with a yellow Flash and Circle with the name of the branch underneath in yellow as well. Another variant was adopted by the Mosley Youth in the early 50s. This design consisted of a red background with a black circle and a white flash.

Usage outside of the BUF
The emblem of the Bulgarian fascist party, Union of Bulgarian National Legions (SBNL) utilised a variant of the version of flash and circle, replacing the swastika. The lightning bolt represented the SBNL striking at communism. Eventually the emblem would replace the lightning bolt with the swastika towards the end of 1944. The insignia of the People's Action Party (PAP) of Singapore is composed of a red flash struck through a smaller blue circle on a white background. The PAP insignia is claimed to represent "action within social/racial unity" with the white background representing purity in thought and deed.

Similar non-political symbols
The simple combination of the lightning bolt and circle has given rise to many similar designs unrelated to the fascist flash and circle. These include the logo of BoltBus, which chose the design before the similarity was ever noticed. The Tampa Bay Lightning hockey team use a somewhat similar design on their primary and alternate logos. One form of warning sign for high-voltage electricity uses a lightning bolt inside a circle, and this was repurposed by Marilyn Manson as an insignia for his album Antichrist Superstar. German automobile manufacturer Opel uses a horizontal lightning bolt and circle in black and white as its logo. In most cases, there is no evidence to suggest that the designer intended to evoke an association with political use of the symbol.

See also
Fasces
Hakenkreuz

References

 Political symbols
Fascist symbols
Fascism in the United Kingdom